Balat is a village, situated around 12 km from Madhubani, state Bihar, India and around 18 km from Darbhanga.

Balat is situated in Balat-Basauli Panchayat of Madhubani Sadar (Rahika) Block.

Cities and towns in Madhubani district